Leo Lesser Ury (November 7, 1861 – October 18, 1931) was a German Impressionist painter and printmaker, associated with the Düsseldorf school of painting.

Life and career
Ury was born in Birnbaum in what was then Prussia (now Międzychód in Poland), the son of a baker whose death in 1872 was followed by the family's relocation to Berlin. In 1878 Lesser left school to apprentice with a tradesman, and the next year he went to Düsseldorf to study painting at the Kunstakademie. Ury spent time in Brussels, Paris, Munich, and other locations, before returning to Berlin in 1887.

His first exhibition was in 1889 and met with a hostile reception, although he was championed by Adolph von Menzel whose influence induced the Akademie to award Ury a prize. In 1893 he joined the Munich Secession, one of the several Secessions formed by progressive artists in Germany and Austria in the last years of the 19th century. In 1901 he returned to Berlin, where he exhibited with the Berlin Secession, first in 1915 and notably in 1922, when he had a major exhibition. By this time Ury's critical reputation had grown and his paintings and pastels were in demand. His subjects were landscapes, urban landscapes, and interior scenes, treated in an Impressionistic manner that ranged from the subdued tones of figures in a darkened interior to the effects of streetlights at night to the dazzling light of foliage against the summer sky. He also painted Biblical scenes, many of which have not survived.

Ury is especially noted for his paintings of nocturnal cafe scenes and rainy streets. He developed a habit of repeating these compositions in order to sell them while retaining the originals, and these quickly-made and inferior copies have harmed his reputation.

Always introverted and distrustful of people, Ury became increasingly reclusive in his later years. He died in Berlin and is buried in the Jewish Cemetery in Berlin-Weissensee.

Gallery

See also
 Tanya Ury

Notes

References
Brauchitsch, Boris von (2013). Lesser Ury. Berlin: Edition Braus. 
Ury, Lesser (1961): Memorial Exhibition Commemorating the 100th anniversary of his birth. Tel Aviv.
Schwartz, Karl (1949). Jewish Artists of the 19th and 20th Centuries. New York: Philosophical Library.
Brieger, Lothar (1921). Lesser Ury. Berlin: Verlag Neue Kunsthandlung.

External links
 
Hecht Museum
Available Works & Biography Galerie Ludorff, Duesseldorf, Germany

1861 births
1931 deaths
19th-century German Jews
People from Międzychód
People from the Province of Posen
19th-century German painters
19th-century German male artists
German male painters
20th-century German painters
20th-century German male artists
German Impressionist painters
Jewish painters